Duota is a Southern Loloish language of Yunnan, China. Duota is spoken in Jiangcheng Hani and Yi Autonomous County, Xinping Yi and Dai Autonomous County, and Yuanjiang Hani, Yi and Dai Autonomous County.

In Yuanjiang County, Duota is spoken in Mili 咪哩乡 and Yangchajie 羊岔街乡 townships (Yuxi 1992:97). Duota is classified as a Haoni language in Yuxi (1992:97), along with Asuo and Budu of Yinyuan Town 因远镇. Li & Minta (2016:157-182) classify the Duota language of Mili Village, Mili Township 咪哩乡, Yuanjiang County as belonging to the Haoni-Baihong language cluster, and include a word list of Duota transcribed using Chinese characters. The Duota are separate from the Duoke 堕课 people of the two hamlets of Xiaogancha 小甘岔 and Xinzhai 新寨 villages near Mili Village 咪哩村 (Li & Minta 2016:8).

References

You Weiqiong [尤伟琼]. 2013. Classifying ethnic groups of Yunnan [云南民族识别研究]. Beijing: Nationalities Press [民族出版社].
Li Kaidong [李凯冬]; Minta Minji [敏塔敏吉]. 2016. Zhongguo Yuanjiang Hanizu Duotaren wenhua shilu [中国元江哈尼族多塔人文化实录]. Kunming: Yunnan People's Press [云南人民出版社]. 

Southern Loloish languages
Languages of Yunnan